In the field of mathematics, the Goss zeta function, named after David Goss, is an analogue of the Riemann zeta function for function fields.  proved that it satisfies an analogue of the Riemann hypothesis.  proved results for a higher-dimensional generalization of the Goss zeta function.

References

Zeta and L-functions